Taras Duray (last name also spelled Duraj, born 31 July 1984) is a Ukrainian former professional football player.

Career
In April 2019 the player (and his last club FC Sumy) was banned from professional football by the Ukrainian Football Federation due to match fixing by players of FC Sumy.

References

External links

 

1984 births
Living people
Sportspeople from Ternopil
Ukrainian footballers
Association football defenders
Ukrainian Premier League players
Ukrainian expatriate footballers
Expatriate footballers in Belarus
Ukrainian expatriate sportspeople in Belarus
FC Nyva Ternopil players
FC Zorya Luhansk players
FC Volyn Lutsk players
FC Belshina Bobruisk players
FC Obolon-Brovar Kyiv players
FC Zirka Kropyvnytskyi players
PFC Sumy players
FC Neman Grodno players
FC Gomel players
Sportspeople involved in betting scandals